The European Association for the Study of the Liver (EASL) is a European professional association for those researching liver disease.

History

EASL was founded by the German physician Gustav-Adolf Martini in April 1966, in Marburg, Germany, to promote research on the liver and its pathology and to improve therapy for liver disorders. EASL's founding was inspired by the American Association for the Study of Liver Diseases (AASLD, created in November 1949) and the International Association for the Study of the Liver (IASL, created in 1958).

Structure

EASL is a nonprofit organization, composed solely of individual members, that performs its duties under a written constitution managed by the EASL Governing Board made up of 11 elected members: the Secretary General, the Vice-Secretary, the Scientific Committee (five persons), the Treasurer, the Educational Councillors (two persons), and the European Policy Councillor. EASL is an Ordinary Member of the United European Gastroenterology.

EASL members meet several times per year and have the annual general meeting during the International Liver Congress.

International Liver Congress

EASL organizes the International Liver Congress, held in various European cities, usually in April. This is an annual scientific meeting where experts and researchers receive information on the latest research, perspectives and treatments of liver disease. Medical experts and specialists will share recent data, present studies and findings, and discuss topics on liver disease. The International Liver Congress attracts more than 9,000 delegates from all over the world.

Journal of Hepatology

The Journal of Hepatology is a monthly, English language, peer-reviewed journal, edited by EASL and published by Elsevier. As the official journal of EASL, it provides an international forum for the publication of original articles, reviews and letters to the Editor describing basic laboratory, translational, and clinical investigations in hepatology. All articles undergo a rigorous peer review and are selected based on the originality of the findings, the superior quality of the work described, and the clarity of presentation.
In 2021, the Journal of Hepatology had an impact factor of 30.083.

The Journal of Hepatology also publishes EASL's Clinical Practice Guidelines. These guidelines assist physicians, healthcare providers, patients and other interested parties in the clinical decision-making process. The EASL Guidelines present a range of state-of-the-art approaches for the diagnosis and treatment of liver diseases.

EASL Hepatology Fellowships
EASL offers a range of different hepatology fellowships:
 EASL Daniel Alagille Award: The purpose of this fellowship is to encourage biomedical research in the field of paediatric and adult genetic cholestatic diseases sharing mutual disease-causing mechanisms.
 PhD Studentship Juan Rodes: Young graduates who want to achieve a PhD degree in the field of basic, translational or clinical hepatology are the focus of this competitive PhD student Research Hepatology Fellowship programme.
 Short-term training fellowship Andrew K. Burroughs: The Short-Term Fellowship programme is directed at postgraduate investigators (both basic and clinical investigators) who intend to spend a limited amount of time (usually 3–6 months) at a foreign institution to accomplish a very focused research project, to learn an experimental procedure or methodology or to get in-depth knowledge about a sophisticated, clinical diagnostic procedure not available at the Home Institution.
 Post-graduate fellowship Sheila Sherlock: This competitive Postdoctoral Research Fellowship programme targets the most promising newly qualified postgraduate researchers who wish to expand research fields and start developing their independent research careers.

See also
 American Association for the Study of Liver Diseases
 American Liver Foundation
 Children's Liver Disease Foundation

References

External links
 
 Journal of Hepatology

Liver
Hepatology organizations
Pan-European scientific societies